STRIDE is a model for identifying computer security threats developed by Praerit Garg and Loren Kohnfelder at Microsoft.   It provides a mnemonic for security threats in six categories.

The threats are:

 Spoofing
 Tampering
 Repudiation
 Information disclosure (privacy breach or data leak)
 Denial of service
 Elevation of privilege

The STRIDE was initially created as part of the process of threat modeling.  STRIDE is a model of threats, used to help reason and find threats to a system.  It is used in conjunction with a model of the target system that can be constructed in parallel.  This includes a full breakdown of processes, data stores, data flows, and trust boundaries.

Today it is often used by security experts to help answer the question "what can go wrong in this system we're working on?"

Each threat is a violation of a desirable property for a system:

Notes on the threats 
Repudiation is unusual because it's a threat when viewed from a security perspective, and a desirable property of some privacy systems, for example, Goldberg's "Off the Record" messaging system.  This is a useful demonstration of the tension that security design analysis must sometimes grapple with.

Elevation of privilege is often called escalation of privilege, or privilege escalation.  They are synonymous.

See also 
 Attack tree – another approach to security threat modeling, stemming from dependency analysis
 Cyber security and countermeasure
 DREAD (risk assessment model) – another mnemonic for security threats
 OWASP – an organization devoted to improving web application security through education
 CIA also known as AIC – another mnemonic for a security model to build security in IT systems

References

External links 
 Uncover Security Design Flaws Using The STRIDE Approach

Computer security